Edward Charles Stuart Baker CIE OBE FZS FLS (1864 – 16 April 1944) was a British ornithologist and police officer. He catalogued the birds of India and produced the second edition of the Fauna of British India which included the introduction of trinomial nomenclature.

Life and career
Baker was educated at Trinity College, Stratford-upon-Avon and in 1883 followed his father into the Indian Police Service. He spent most of his career in India in the Assam Police, rising to the rank of Inspector-General commanding the force. In 1910 he was placed on Special Criminal Investigation duty. In 1911 he returned to England and took up the appointment of Chief Police Officer of the Port of London Police, remaining in this position until his retirement in 1925. For his services in this role during the First World War he was appointed Officer of the Order of the British Empire (OBE) in the 1920 civilian war honours. After retirement he became Mayor of Croydon.

He was an excellent tennis player and an enthusiastic big game hunter. He lost his left arm to a panther (in Silchar, Assam), was tossed by a gaur and trampled by an Indian rhinoceros during various hunting expeditions.

Ornithology

During his spare time he studied and collected the birds of India. His books included The Indian Ducks and their Allies (1908), Game Birds of India and Ceylon (1921), The Fauna of British India, Including Ceylon and Burma. Birds. (1922; eight volumes), Mishmi Man-eater (1928), The Nidification of the Birds of the Indian Empire (1932), and Cuckoo Problems (1942; the cuckoo was his chief interest within ornithology). He made a comprehensive collection of nearly 50,000 Indian birds' eggs, part of which he donated to the Natural History Museum, where he spent a lot of time working on the egg collections from India and Thailand. His eight-volume contribution to  The Fauna of British India, Including Ceylon and Burma series became the standard reference work on the subject. Part of the collection, about 152 specimens were sold to the private museum of the Tzar Ferdinand I of Bulgaria. He also served on government advisory committees on the protection of birds and was from 1913 to 1936 honorary secretary and treasurer of the British Ornithologists' Union.

Apart from specimens that he collected or received from others both of eggs and birds, Baker also maintained a small menagerie for a time when he was posted in the North Cachar district. The animals in his collection included civets, bears, deer and crested serpent eagles, Amur falcons, falconets and woodpeckers.

Some of the nest and eggs in his collection have been considered as of dubious provenance and there are suggestions that he artificially made up some of the clutches. Some like Charles Vaurie have considered it so unreliable that they even suggested the destruction of his egg collection.

Baker's yuhina (Yuhina bakeri) was named in his honour.

Publications
Baker's early publications were focussed on the North Cachar Hill district where he worked. He also collected eggs and published a catalogue of them. He also published some notes on species whose nesting had not been described by Allan Octavian Hume and sent these to the Ibis journal. He also described a new species Elachura haplonota which was collected by a Naga hunter for him but this species had already been described by Godwin-Austen and Walden under the genus Pnoepyga chocolatina (it is now called Spelaeornis chocolatinus). His series on the bulbuls of the region included paintings made by him of the birds set in backgrounds having ornate plants from the region.

The Birds of North Cachar
 
 
 
 
 
 
 
 
 
 
 
 
 Bulbuls of North Cachar
 
 
 
 
 
 
 

In some of his early writings he pointed out errors in the identification keys (for instance for the minivets) given by E.W. Oates in the Fauna of British India. This was followed by a more careful re-examination of specimens and he established himself as a careful taxonomist.

This period of publications was followed by a major series on the ducks of India. These were illustrated by plates made by J.G. Keulemans. This established him as an expert on the game birds.

 
 
 
 
 
 
 
  
 
 
 

The work on ducks led to a further series on the waders and other game birds and this eventually led to a multi-volume book on game-birds. This series began in 1910 and ended in 1934. Along the way Baker also began to revise a list of the species found in India based on the work of Hartert for the Palearctic region. Baker introduced trinomials in his "hand-list".

 
 
 
 
 
 
 
 
 
 
 
 
 
 
 
 
 
 
 
 
 
 
 
 
 
 
 
 
 
 
 
 
 
 
 
 
 
 
 
 
 
 
 
 
 
 
 
 
 
 
 
 
 
 
 
 
 
 
 
 
 
 
 
 

Hand-list of the birds of India

Range extensions

Baker continued to update the list and make corrections and note rarities being reported and on distributions. He noted the occurrence of Bewick's swans and Anser brachyrhynchus (from near Dibrugarh).

Books
Several of Baker's works were revised and produced as books. The most significant work was the second edition to the Fauna of British India series on birds. He noted that it was work in process and that errors were always likely to creep in. Some misprints and other problems were pointed out for instance by C.B. Ticehurst. Some like T.R. Livesey and Hugh Whistler were completely opposed to Baker's use of trinomials.

Baker took an interest in cuckoos and puzzled over how their eggs matched those of their hosts despite a single species parasitizing multiple species of hosts with entirely different kinds of eggs. He believed that cuckoos laid their egg on the ground and carried them in their bills into the nest of their host. He even cited Hume for a note on shooting a cuckoo with an egg looking like that of the host in its bill. One of Baker's correspondent provided him a blue egg from the oviduct of a female that had been shot. In a later note he observed that cuckoos destroyed one or two of the host's eggs before adding its own. Towards the end of his life Baker took a renewed interest in the ecology and evolution of cuckoos and was the topic of his last book in 1942.

 
 
 
Fauna of British India - second edition

Hand-list

Nidification of Birds
 
 
 
 .
 Cuckoo problems

Footnotes

References

Obituary, The Times, 18 April 1944
Obituary, Ibis. 1944:413-415

1864 births
1944 deaths
English ornithologists
British Chief Constables
Indian Police Service officers in British India
Officers of the Order of the British Empire
Companions of the Order of the Indian Empire
Naturalists of British India
Fellows of the Zoological Society of London
Fellows of the Linnean Society of London